Konjska Reka is a village in the municipality of Bajina Bašta, Serbia. "Konjska Reka" means "horse's river" in Serbian. According to the 2002 census, the village has a population of  112 people.

References

Populated places in Zlatibor District